Carenum fulgidum is a species of ground beetle in the subfamily Scaritinae. It was described by Sloane in 1917.

References

fulgidum
Beetles described in 1917